Barun Sengupta (23 January 1934 – 19 June 2008), the founder-editor of Bartaman newspaper, was a Bengali journalist and popular political critic. He is remembered for his bold and simple diction of political analysing that made him extremely well liked among the common readers in West Bengal.

Life
Son of Nirmalananda Sengupta and Ranibala Devi, Barun Sengupta was born in Barisal (in present-day Bangladesh). Sengupta, along with his family, moved to Kolkata before the partition of India in 1947 and rented a house near Baithakkhana Market in north-central Kolkata.

His education started in B.M. School, Barisal. Later he was admitted to Town School, Kolkata. After graduating in commerce from City College, Kolkata, he founded a periodical named Bhabikal which lasted a few issues. In 1957, he founded another weekly named Bartaman with the aid of Hemanta Kumar Bose, a popular leader of the political party, Forward Bloc. He joined Anandabazar Patrika in 1960 and became its first designated political correspondent in 1965. During the Emergency, he was sent to jail along with another reporter, Gour Kishore Ghosh.

In 1984, he left Anandabazar Patrika to start his own journal and launched Bartaman, a daily, on 7 December that year. For its straightforward and intrepid style, the journal became extremely popular among the common Bengali readers. Later Sengupta launched two more periodicals - Saptahik Bartaman, a weekly and Sukhi Grihokon, a monthly and this time too it was a success. These two journals are now widely read in West Bengal.
He died in a south Kolkata nursing home after a brief illness.

Books
He wrote several books on India's political situation. One of his controversial book Indira Ekadashi was based on the 11-year tenure (1966–77) of Indira Gandhi as the Prime Minister of India.
 Pala Badaler Pala
 Sab Chatitra Kalpanik
 Bipak-i-stan
 Andhakarer Antaraley
 Netajir Antardhan Rahasya

Further reading
 Barun Sengupta Rachana Sangraha (Collected Works of Barun Sengupta in Bengali), Ananda Publishers Pvt Ltd, Kolkata - 700009

References

External links
 News of Sengupta's Death and a short biography from The Telegraph -
 News of Sengupta's Death from Indian Express -
 Biography of Barun Sengupta from Yahoo News - 

Indian newspaper editors
Indian newspaper founders
Indian editors
1934 births
2008 deaths
Bengali Hindus
20th-century Bengalis
Bengali writers
Bengali-language writers
City College, Kolkata alumni
University of Calcutta alumni
Indians imprisoned during the Emergency (India)
People from Barisal District
Writers from Kolkata
Journalists from West Bengal
Indian male journalists
Indian journalists
Indian newspaper journalists
20th-century Indian journalists
Indian magazine founders
Indian critics
Indian writers
20th-century Indian writers
Indian political writers
Indian political journalists
Indian political scientists
Indian non-fiction writers
20th-century Indian non-fiction writers
Indian male non-fiction writers
20th-century political scientists